Nelbert Omolon (born June 30, 1980 in Talakag, Bukidnon) is a Filipino retired professional basketball player. He last played for the San Miguel Beermen of the Philippine Basketball Association (PBA). He was drafted 8th overall in the 2004 PBA draft that included Rich Alvarez, Marc Pingris, James Yap, Ranidel de Ocampo, Gary David, Sonny Thoss and Wesley Gonzales.

Early years
The youngest of three boys, Omolon was born and raised in Talakag, Bukidnon, 36 kilometers from Cagayan de Oro. He did not learn how to play when he was a kid. He never even liked the game until he grew from 5'7" as a high school freshman to 6'2" as junior.

College career

Omolon played for the PCU Dolphins.

Professional career

Philippine Basketball League
After playing in PCU, he took his sneakers to the Philippine Basketball League where he suited up for Osaka-La Salle and ICTSI under coach Franz Pumaren and Welcoat under coach Leo Austria.

Philippine Basketball Association
Omolon joined the PBA after being drafted 8th overall by the Sta. Lucia Realtors in the 2004 PBA draft.

Omolon scored a personal high 40 points on 11-of-16 shooting in the two-point area and hitting 4-of-5 beyond the arc with nine boards as Sta. Lucia earned its first ever outright semifinals slot on January 13, 2008 with a 123-106 rout over the Air21 Express.

In January 2012, Omolon was traded for the first time in his career to Air21 from the Meralco Bolts along with Mark Isip in exchange for Dennis Daa, Mark Canlas and a draft pick that originally belonged to the Bolts.

On September 12, 2014, Nelbert Omolon was signed up by the San Miguel Beermen as the 13th man in the Beermen's roster.

Player profile
A player who ever reliable on both ends of the floor due to his unrelenting defense and efficient offense, Omolon has continued to impress his coaches in the pro league to this day. He is a player who is always tasked to guard the opposing team's best player and even imports. He can be the team MVP of the game and not score a point. Although possessing a limited array of offensive moves, Nelbert has showed he can do it as well on offense. With an improved outside shot these days, he is looked to provide a complementary role to his more offensive-minded teammates in Meralco.

References

1980 births
Living people
Air21 Express players
Basketball players from Bukidnon
Meralco Bolts players
PCU Dolphins basketball players
People from Bukidnon
Philippines men's national basketball team players
Filipino men's basketball players
San Miguel Beermen players
Small forwards
Sta. Lucia Realtors players
Sta. Lucia Realtors draft picks